Xandr, Inc. (pronounced "Zander") is the advertising and analytics subsidiary of Microsoft, which operates an online platform, Community, for buying and selling consumer-centric digital advertising.

In December 2021, AT&T announced that they had agreed to sell Xandr (including AppNexus and Clypd) to Microsoft for an undisclosed price. The acquisition was completed in June 2022.

History
Following its June 2018 acquisition of AppNexus, Xandr was formed by AT&T to construct a national TV advertising marketplace.

Xandr was launched, on September 25, 2018, at its inaugural AT&T Relevance Conference, in Santa Barbara, California, and was named after its parent company founder, Alexander Graham Bell.

In June 2019, Xandr rebranded its AppNexus DSP, launching Xandr Invest, to serve as its central ad-buying hub.

On October 18, 2019, Xandr acquired Massachusetts-based Clypd, an audience-based sales platform for television advertising.

On April 30, 2020, it was folded into WarnerMedia. 

Rumors and speculation spread in 2020 that AT&T was seeking to sell and offload Xandr, along with DirecTV and Crunchyroll.  The reasoning is twofold: first, AT&T took on immense debt to purchase WarnerMedia, and any non-core asset sales would help pay off that debt burden.  Secondly, Xandr was inherently compromised by its association with AT&T and HBO Max, as many would-be advertisers were reluctant to use what is essentially a competitor for their ad buys, and as such it might be more lucrative on its own.

On May 17, 2021, it was announced that WarnerMedia would be merged with Discovery, Inc. to form a new publicly traded company known as Warner Bros. Discovery, but that the Xandr business would not be included in the transaction and would remain a division of AT&T. On December 21, 2021, AT&T announced that they had agreed to sell Xandr (including AppNexus and Clypd) to Microsoft for an undisclosed price, subject to customary closing conditions, including regulatory reviews.

On June 6, 2022, Microsoft completed the acquisition of Xandr to bolster its advertising and retail media business, for about USD $1 billion.

Leadership
Xandr is led by Mike Welch, after the departure in March 2020 by former GroupM North America CEO Brian Lesser, who was appointed chief executive officer of AT&T advertising and analytics in 2017. Kirk McDonald, who served as interim CEO following Lesser's departure, moved to GroupM, a subsidiary of WPP, in August 2020.

Operations
In May 2019, Xandr launched Community, its new video marketplace that connects advertisers, publishers, and consumer media brands, including AT&T's former WarnerMedia (now Warner Bros. Discovery) platforms: CNN, TNT, TruTV, B/R Live, and Otter Media. Other media on the Community platform includes Vice Media, Hearst Communications, Newsy, Philo, Tubi, and Xumo, Vudu, and Bloomberg.

The fee-transparent, consumer-centric Xandr advertising model combines data, AT&T’s then newly acquired WarnerMedia content, AppNexus, and other proprietary advertising technology, to integrate with AT&T’s consumer network, creating the first personalized advertising of its kind, with different commercials being delivered to different viewers simultaneously.

During its first year, Xandr’s revenue was mainly derived from DirecTV sales. The company has approximately 1800 employees, including 60 in Europe.

References

External links
 

Analytics companies
Digital marketing companies of the United States
American companies established in 2018
2018 establishments in New York City
Advertising agencies based in New York City
Marketing companies established in 2018
Online advertising services and affiliate networks
Former AT&T subsidiaries
Microsoft acquisitions 
Microsoft subsidiaries
2022 mergers and acquisitions